Matt or Matthew Carter may refer to:

 Matt Carter (politician) (born 1972), former General Secretary of the British Labour Party
 Matt Carter (racing driver) (born 1981), automobile racer
 Matt Carter (Canadian football) (born 1986), Canadian football wide receiver
 Matthew Carter (born 1937), typeface designer
 Matt Carter (cricketer) (born 1996), English cricketer
 Matthew Carter (diver) (born 2000), Australian diver
 Matthew G. Carter (1913–2012), first African-American mayor of Montclair, New Jersey
 Matt Carter, guitarist for the band Emery
 Matt Carter (Coronation Street), a character on Coronation Street